The Postal Museum is a postal museum in Vaduz, Liechtenstein. It is a branch museum of Liechtenstein National Museum.

History
The museum was founded in 1930 and opened in 1936. Afterwards, the museum had been relocated several times until it sits at its current building at English Building Art Space.

Exhibitions
The museum exhibits postage stamps issued by Liechtenstein since 1912 and also the history of postal service of the country.

See also
 Kunstmuseum Liechtenstein

References

External links

 

1936 establishments in Liechtenstein
Museums established in 1936
Museums in Vaduz
Postal museums
Philatelic museums